William Parnell may refer to:

 William R. Parnell (1836–1910), Irish-born adventurer and soldier
 William Parnell (architect) (died 1886), English architect
 William Parnell (cricketer) (1837–1879),  British Army officer and cricketer
 Bill Parnell (1928–2008), Canadian middle distance runner